John Norman Hulbert (24 April 189225 March 1978) was a British actor, director, screenwriter and singer, specializing primarily in comedy productions, and often working alongside his wife (Dame) Cicely Courtneidge.

Biography
Born in Ely, Cambridgeshire, he was the elder and more successful son of Henry Harper Hulbert, a physician, being the brother of the actor Claude Hulbert. He was educated at Westminster School and Caius College, Cambridge and appeared in many shows and revues, mainly with the Cambridge Footlights. He was one of the earliest famous alumni of the comedy club.

After Cambridge, he earned recognition and fame performing in musicals and light comedies. However the First World War delayed his rise to fame; on 14 February 1916, while still an actor, he married Cicely Courtneidge, the daughter of Robert Courtneidge, a theatrical manager, in Hampstead. On 2 March, the Military Service Act 1916 came into force and Hulbert was expecting to be conscripted into the army for the remainder of the conflict. 
However, he appears to have been exempted. In June 1916, Hulbert and Courtneidge were appearing together in a sketch called “A Lucky Mistake”, and in December 1916 he was appearing at the Comedy Revue in "See-Saw". In May 1917, he opened at the Comedy in "Bubbly", and the Illustrated Sporting and Dramatic News commented that "Mr. Jack Hulbert, Miss Winnie Melville, and Miss Irene Greville also stay on at this same munition factory for high explosives of laughter". After the war, Hulbert continued his career in the theatre.

Hulbert made his film debut in Elstree Calling (1930); appearing opposite his wife and frequent stage and screen co-star Cicely Courtneidge. His career went through a successful period during the 1930s when he appeared in several films, including The Ghost Train (1931), Love on Wheels (1932) and Bulldog Jack (1935), a tongue-in-cheek homage to the popular Bulldog Drummond films in which Jack was supported by his brother Claude.

In 1931 Courtneidge and Hulbert suffered a serious setback when they discovered that their financial manager had been speculating with their money, suffering heavy losses and putting their business into liquidation. Hulbert accepted responsibility for all the business's debts and undertook to repay every creditor.

He had a hit record in 1932 "The Flies Crawled Up the Window", which was originally sung in the film Jack's the Boy. In 1934 he was voted the most popular male British star at the box office.

In 1936 exhibitors voted him the third most popular British film star.

Hulbert's popularity waned as the 1930s came to an end, and after the war he and his wife continued to entertain chiefly on stage. In 1951 he appeared in the West End in The White Sheep of the Family and the following year directed his brother in Lord Arthur Savile's Crime. In 1958 he starred with Yvonne Arnaud in Ronald Millar's The Big Tickle. In 1962 he appeared in the BBC radio sitcom Discord in Three Flats, along with Courtneidge and Vic Oliver.

Personal life
His marriage to Cicely Courtneidge lasted for 62 years until his death. Their relationship is mentioned in the British television series Dad's Army in the episode Ring Dem Bells when Hulbert pulls out of shooting a Home Guard training film to spend time with his wife.

In 1975, Hulbert published his autobiography, The Little Woman's Always Right. Hulbert died, at the age of 85, at his home in Westminster, London on 25 March 1978.

Filmography

Film

Television

Theatre

References

Bibliography

 Green, Stanley. (2009). Encyclopedia of the Musical Theatre. Da Capo Press
 Wearing, J. P. (2014). The London Stage 1920-1929: A Calendar of Productions, Performances and Personnel. Rowman & Littlefield Education (2nd edition)
 Landy, Marcia. (2014). British Genres: Cinema and Society, 1930-1960. Princeton University Press
 Hartley, Cathy. (2013). A Historical Dictionary of British Women. Routledge

External links

 Jack Hulbert & Cicely Courtneidge archive, Theatre Collection, University of Bristol

Jack Hulbert Britmovie | Home of British Films
Jack Hulbert BFI
Jack Hulbert BFI Screenonline

1892 births
1978 deaths
English male film actors
English male musical theatre actors
People from Ely, Cambridgeshire
People educated at Westminster School, London
Alumni of Gonville and Caius College, Cambridge
Musicians from Cambridgeshire
Male actors from Cambridgeshire
20th-century English male actors
English male stage actors
20th-century English singers
20th-century English comedians
British male comedy actors
20th-century British male singers